Buses are currently one of the main types of public transport in Hanoi, beside Hanoi Metro, comprising more than 150 routes operated by the state-owned Transerco and several private companies serving the city centre and towns in greater Hanoi as well as connecting Hanoi with neighbouring provinces. Buses in Hanoi are easily recognisable with their red and yellow colours but buses on a number of routes are also painted green, blue and orange. The earliest bus leaves at 4:30 am while the latest bus leaves at 10:30 pm, with service may be lengthened to 11:30 pm on weekends on a number of routes. Most Hanoi buses are equipped with an audio system to announce the next stop. LED panels are installed at a number of bus stops to display live arrivals information.

Routes 

The network includes subsidized buses, non-subsidized buses, airport buses and provincial buses that connect Hanoi with neighbouring provinces.

Subsidized buses 
There are currently over 100 government-subsidized bus routes in Hanoi, numbering from 01 to 126. Branch routes of a main route are usually marked by the number plus a letter. For example, 06B, running between Giap Bat Bus Station and Hong Van and shares most of its route with 06, is a branch route of 06. The system also includes BRT and DRT services.

Hanoi have been planning to put the CNG buses into service with three new routes in July 2018. However, service only started two months later in September 2018. Now, there are 7 routers using CNG bus in Hanoi, from 157 to 163.

Routes 18 (National Economics University), 23 (Nguyen Cong Tru), 56B (Vietnam Buddhist Academy) and 146 (Hao Nam) are loop routes.

Non-subsidized buses

Airport buses 

In addition to four subsidized routes serving Noi Bai International Airport: 07 (from Cau Giay Bus Station), 17 (from Long Bien Bus Interchange), 90 (from Kim Ma Bus Station) and 109 (from My Dinh Bus Station) Transerco also operates two high-quality non-subsidized routes, numbered 68, from Me Linh Plaza (Ha Dong) and 86, from Hanoi Railway Station.

Provincial routes 
These routes connect Hanoi with nearby provinces like Hung Yen, Ha Nam, Bac Ninh and Bac Giang, as well as further districts from the city centre like Ba Vi. The fare is usually divided along different sections of the route, and usually mounts up to 20,000 - 30,000 VND for a whole trip between the termini.

Fares 

The fare for a single ride costs between VND 7,000 and VND 9,000 depending on the length of the route. Regular commuters can purchase a monthly pass at VND 100,000 to use on a specific route or VND 200,000 to use on all routes. Students, industrial zone workers and the elderly only have to pay half the price for a monthly pass.

List of bus routes in Hanoi (Updated until Dec 2021)

City routes 
These are routes listed with numbers smaller than 200, with a few special routes like BRT and CNG routes.

Provincial routes (201 and upper) 
Distinguished by its large numbering, these routes connect Hanoi with nearby provinces:

202. Gia Lam (Hanoi) - Hai Duong

203. Giap Bat (Hanoi) - Bac Giang

204. Long Bien (Hanoi) - Thuan Thanh (Bac Ninh)

205. Gia Lam (Hanoi) - 5th National Highway - Hung Yen City

206. Giap Bat (Hanoi) - Phu Ly (Ha Nam)

207. Gia Lam (Hanoi) - Trieu Duong 

208. Giap Bat (Hanoi) - Khoai Chau (Hung Yen)

209. Giap Bat (Hanoi) - 1st National Highway - Hung Yen City

210. Gia Lam (Hanoi) - Hiep Hoa (Bac Giang)

212. My Dinh (Hanoi) - Que Vo (Bac Ninh)

213. Yen Nghia (Hanoi) - Binh An (Hoa Binh)

214. Yen Nghia (Hanoi) - Ha Nam

Discontinued services 
These routes either changed their numbers, merged with other routes or went defunct:

 16A. My Dinh - Giap Bat and 16B My Dinh - Nuoc Ngam merged to form 16: My Dinh - Nuoc Ngam
 207. Giap Bat - Van Giang (Hung Yen) (a few sections merged with 208)
 211. My Dinh (Hanoi) - Vinh Yen
 Fast routes: Experimental services running on normal routes, with less stops to ensure shorter trip time. They were carried out on routes 02, 08, 16, 27, 28, 32, 54

Bus Operations Units in Hanoi 
 Units of Hanoi Transportation Corporation (TRANSERCO)

- Hanoi Bus Enterprise: 01, 03A, 04, 11, 15, 17, 23, 31, 36, 52A, 52B, 100, 108.

- Thang Long Bus Enterprise: 14, 16, 18, 26, 30, 38, 39, 106, 107.

- 10-10 Bus Enterprise: 05, 13, 20A, 20B, 28, 29, 50, 53A, 53B, 67, 92, 95, 96, 97, 110, 111.

- Hanoi Electric Vehicle JSC.: 07, 25, 27, 34, 35A, 35B, 55A, 55B, 56A, 56B, 109.

- Cau Buou Bus Enterprise: 06D, 06E, 22A, 22B, 22C, 24, 32, 84, 85, 91, 103A, 103B.

- Yen Vien Bus Enterprise: 03B, 10A, 10B, 40, 54, 86, 90, 93, 112.

- Lien Ninh Transportation and Service JSC.: 08A, 08B, 09, 19, 21A, 21B, 37, 125.

- Newway Transportation JSC.: 47A, 47B, 48, 94.

- Hanoi Passenger Car JSC: 49, 51, 122, 124, 212.

- Tan Dat Center: 06A, 06B, 06C, 12, 33, 62, 101A, 101B, 104, 113, 115.

- Southern Hanoi Passenger Car Enterprise: 63, 68, 87, 88, 98, 99.

- Hanoi Express Bus Enterprise: 02, 66, 89, 102, 105, BRT 01.

 Non-TRANSERCO units:
- Bac Ha Limited Company: 41, 42, 43, 44, 45.

- Dong Anh Transport, Trading and Tourism Joint Stock Company: 46, 123

- Bao Yen Tourism, Service and Construction Company Limited: 57, 58, 59, 60A, 60B, 61, 65, CNG01, CNG02, CNG03, CNG04, CNG05, CNG06, CNG07.

- Hai Van International Shipping Joint Venture Company: 64, 74.

- Ha Tay Passenger Car Joint Stock Company: 72, 118, 126.

- Vinbus (Vingroup Corporation): E01, E03, E05.

Bus live-tracking  

Travellers can use a mobile app called Tìm Buýt to find the bus routes between the departure and arrival points. The app is available on the web, iOS, Android and Windows Phone.
The Windows Phone app has been discontinued while the app on Android and iOS is available in both Vietnamese and English.

The brand identity system of the Hanoi bus 
Buses are painted with peace bird symbol and Hanoi's Symbol Khue Van Cac on its body.

References

Transport in Hanoi
Hanoi